OWF may refer to:

Oceania Weightlifting Federation
Ohio Works First
One-way function
one world foundation
Open Web Foundation
Order of Women Freemasons